Ironside is an American police drama television series created by Collier Young, that aired on NBC from October 2 to October 23, 2013 during the 2013–14 television season. It was a remake of the original television series Ironside, which ran from 1967 to 1975. It starred Blair Underwood as the title character, wheelchair-using cop Robert Ironside, the only character re-created from the original series. The remade Ironside was grittier and considerably more violent than the original, and the setting was changed from San Francisco to New York City.

Ratings and reviews were unfavorable to the series, and it was canceled on October 18. Only four episodes were aired.

Production
The pilot was written by Michael Caleo, who was also the executive producer, while Universal TV, Davis Entertainment and Yellow Brick Road produced the show.

According to various news outlets, the plot of the show revolved around "a tough, sexy but acerbic police detective using a wheelchair after a shooting" who "is hardly limited by his disability as he pushes and prods his hand-picked team to solve the most difficult cases in the city."

The pilot episode was released for free early on September 10, 2013, via iTunes Store, Amazon.com, and Hulu.

Cast and characters
 Blair Underwood as Robert Ironside
 Brent Sexton as Gary Stanton
 Pablo Schreiber as Virgil
 Spencer Grammer as Holly
 Neal Bledsoe as Teddy
 Kenneth Choi as Captain Ed Rollins
Jake Picking as Nate

Episodes

Reception
The new Ironside received negative reviews. A summary on Rotten Tomatoes said, "Ironside is an unnecessary, lackluster remake that could be a decent police procedural if it wasn't so mundane and monotonous."

Brian Tallerico of HollywoodChicago called it the "Worst New Drama of 2013" and awarded it 1 star out of 5, saying: "[Ironside is] the most clichéd, least believable, least fun, and just awful new drama of the year. It is aggressively bad. Avoid at all costs. Blair Underwood ... deserves better than the horrendous, uninteresting writing here. [Ironside] should be a way to explore how our physical well-being is only one part of our lives and how we approach our work, even crimefighting. It’s not. It’s just manipulative drama that hopes to make you stand up and cheer by reminding you over and over again how tough its title character remains."

Neil Genzlinger of The New York Times called the title character "an unpleasant combination of macho and brusque" and the handling of his disability "thuddingly didactic" and "one that is not doing real people with disabilities any favors". He called the storylines "bland", the reason for Ironside's disability "predictable" and the writing "plodding". (The backstory of Ironside's disabling wound was different in the remake than in the original series.)

Robert Bianco of USA Today gave the show 1.5 stars out of 4. He called it an "atrociously clunky" remake that "jettison[ed] whatever wit and intelligence the original possessed".

Controversy
Controversy arose over the decision to cast non-disabled actor Blair Underwood in the role of paraplegic Robert Ironside. Sons of Anarchy actor Kurt Yaeger, himself an amputee, compared the act to blackface, and said disabled characters should be played by disabled actors. Auti Angel, a paralyzed actress who appears in the Sundance Channel's reality series Push Girls was quoted as saying "What are they afraid of? There are so many extremely talented individuals who are performing artists with a different ability." Larry Sapp, a disabled independent filmmaker, went as far as to boycott the show by starting a Facebook page called Don't Shoot Ironside. However, fellow Push Girls star Angela Rockwood says she is not opposed to Ironside because the drama, like her show, challenges perceptions of how those in wheelchairs should look and act.

Teri Weinberg, executive producer of Ironside, stated that the role was cast with a non-disabled actor because the show features flashbacks to Ironside's life before he became a paraplegic, which "required an actor to be on their feet in their previous life".

References

External links
 

2010s American crime drama television series
2013 American television series debuts
2013 American television series endings
2010s American crime television series
2010s American drama television series
2010s American police procedural television series
English-language television shows
Fictional portrayals of the New York City Police Department
NBC original programming
Television series by Universal Television
Television shows set in New York City
Television remakes
American detective television series